Sydney Sibilia (born 19 November 1981) is an Italian film director, producer, and screenwriter.

Filmography
I Can Quit Whenever I Want (2014)
I Can Quit Whenever I Want: Masterclass (2017)
I Can Quit Whenever I Want: Ad Honorem (2017)
Rose Island (2020)
Mixed by Erry (2023)

References

External links
 
 

1981 births
Living people
People from Salerno
Italian film directors
Italian screenwriters
Italian film producers